{{DISPLAYTITLE:Prostaglandin D2 receptor}}
The prostaglandin D2 (PGD2) receptors are G protein-coupled receptors that bind and are activated by prostaglandin D2. They include the following proteins:

 Prostaglandin D2 receptor 1 (DP1) - 
 Prostaglandin D2 receptor 2 (DP2) -

See also 
 Eicosanoid receptor
 Prostaglandin E2 receptor

References

External links 
 

Eicosanoids
G protein-coupled receptors